The Home Guard: School March for Piano is a song from 1910 written by M. Greenwald and published by Will Wood.

References 

Bibliography
Crew, Danny O. “Presidential Sheet Music: An Illustrated Catalogue of Published Music Associated with the American Presidency and Those Who Sought the Office”. Jefferson, North Carolina: McFarland, 2001.  
Parker, Bernard S. “World War I Sheet Music: 9,670 Patriotic Songs Published in the United States, 1914–1920, with More Than 600 Covers Illustrated. Jefferson, N.C.: McFarland, 2007.

External links
 View the song MP3 and sheet music here

1910 songs
March music